Ousmane Viera Diarrassouba (born 21 December 1986) is an Ivorian professional footballer who plays as a defender.

International career
He represented his country at the 2008 Olympic Games.

Career statistics

International

International goals

Honours

Club
CFR Cluj
Liga I: 2007–08
Romanian Cup: 2007–08, 2008–09

Pandurii Târgu Jiu
Liga I: Runner-up 2012–13

International
Ivory Coast
Africa Cup of Nations: 2015

References

External links
 
 
 

1986 births
Living people
People from Daloa
Ivorian footballers
CFR Cluj players
FC Internațional Curtea de Argeș players
CS Pandurii Târgu Jiu players
Çaykur Rizespor footballers
Adanaspor footballers
Sepsi OSK Sfântu Gheorghe players
FC Hermannstadt players
Liga I players
Liga II players
Süper Lig players
Footballers at the 2008 Summer Olympics
Olympic footballers of Ivory Coast
Ivory Coast international footballers
Ivorian expatriate footballers
Expatriate footballers in Romania
Ivorian expatriate sportspeople in Romania
Expatriate footballers in Turkey
Ivorian expatriate sportspeople in Turkey
2014 FIFA World Cup players
2015 Africa Cup of Nations players
Africa Cup of Nations-winning players
Association football defenders